KPRC is a broadcast radio station in the United States. Licensed to Houston, Texas, KPRC has a talk radio format and is owned by iHeartMedia. A Fox News Radio affiliate, KPRC broadcasts mostly conservative talk radio shows and originates Walton & Johnson and The Jesse Kelly Show. Additionally, KPRC broadcasts University of Houston sports.

KPRC first signed on in 1925 as the radio station of the Houston Post-Dispatch. For much of its history, KPRC was a full service station featuring news, music, sports and entertainment. After decades of being a MOR music station for much of the 1970s, KPRC became a full-time news and talk station in 1977. The station was owned by the family of Houston Post-Dispatch founder William P. Hobby before being sold to Sunbelt Broadcasting, a company partially owned by Dan Patrick, in 1992. Sunbelt then sold KPRC to Clear Channel Communications (now iHeartMedia) in 1995.

History

Early history (1923–1941)
In 1923, Houston Post-Dispatch owner Ross S. Sterling met Alfred P. Daniel, a radio instructor at a Houston YMCA whose students included Sterling's son Ross Sterling Jr. The elder Sterling and Daniel discussed starting a new radio station affiliated with the Post-Dispatch. William P. Hobby, president and publisher of the Post-Dispatch, asked Sterling to launch the radio station. 

Before a  Westinghouse Electric transmitter arrived in Houston, Sterling Jr. died. In 1925, when the World Advertising Convention was to be held in Houston featuring U.S. Commerce Secretary Herbert Hoover, Daniel again talked to Sterling Sr. about the radio station idea. Sterling agreed, and the radio station was created in three weeks. On May 9, 1925, their radio station KPRC signed on at 1010 kHz and 500 watts of power, with Daniel as the station's first announcer and program director. Guests on the opening broadcast included William P. Hobby, Texas poet laureate Judd Mortimer Lewis, and the First Garrison Band of Mexico. The call signs stood for "Kotton Port Rail Center", a reference to the cotton trade. 

Broadcasting from the "Skyline Studios" at the 22-story Houston Post-Dispatch building in downtown Houston, KPRC featured daily live music and a daily children's storytelling show hosted by Lewis, Uncle Judd's Kiddies' Hour.

In 1927, it interrupted its scheduled programming to give out dispatches for the Houston Police Department. That year, KPRC moved from 1010 to 920 kHz. Tex Ritter had a Saturday show on KPRC in the late 1920s singing original country ballads.

KPRC co-founded the Texas Quality Network (TQN) in 1934 with three of the other top radio stations in Texas: WBAP in Fort Worth, WFAA in Dallas, and WOAI in San Antonio. Connecting the four stations by telephone line, TQN enabled them to make simultaneous broadcasts of the same program. The four stations also provided over 100 kW of power combined at night. TQN featured sports and music programs sponsored by various local businesses, for instance football games sponsored by Humble Oil and The Light Crust Doughboys, a country music show. By 1935, KPRC became a member of the NBC Radio Network.

KPRC increased its power tenfold to 5 kW in 1936. Then in 1937, KPRC and KTRH co-installed what was the second transmitter in the world that could send waves from two stations at the same time.

Move to 950 kHz, additions of FM and TV stations (1941–1958)
The Houston Post later expanded into FM radio and television, starting with founding KPRC-FM in 1946. In 1950, the Houston Post purchased KLEE-TV and renamed it KPRC-TV.

Construction began in 1952 for a new $400,000 facility for operating the KPRC AM, FM, and TV stations.

Sale of FM station, MOR format (1958–1977)
The Houston Post sold KPRC-FM in 1958.

In the 1960s and much of the 1970s, KPRC had an middle of the road (MOR) music format. A 1966 advertisement claimed that the station had the largest news staff of any Houston radio station and 20 billboards that had lights connected by telephone lines to its newsroom. The billboard lights shined when KPRC had news broadcasts.

During Hurricane Carla in September 1961, KPRC AM and TV broadcast live coverage for 113 straight hours, starting three days before the hurricane reached land; KPRC AM was the flagship station among nearly 40 affiliates of the Gulf Coast Hurricane Warning Network.

In 1962, KPRC broadcast the inaugural season of the Houston Colt .45s, a new Major League Baseball team. When the Colt .45s became the Houston Astros in 1965, KPRC continued broadcasting the games, with Gene Elston and Loel Passe hired as announcers. Other sports programming in the 1960s included University of Houston basketball, Rice University basketball, and Southwest Conference football.

Billboard magazine's Radio Response Ratings survey in April 1965 found that KPRC had the highest ratings among stations that played pop standards albums, in all time slots from morning to late evening. The strong ratings continued into 1966, when KPRC began adding comedy shows and jazz music.

The KPRC TV and AM stations moved to a new $3.2 million, 86,000 square foot facility on March 22, 1972. Former U.S. President Lyndon B. Johnson visited the dedication ceremony that day.

In the spring 1976 Arbitron survey, KPRC ranked tenth in the Houston/Galveston market with an average 15,100 listeners per week. Having reduced music programming in recent years, KPRC changed its programming in 1976 to have talk shows during the day and music in evenings.

Change from music to talk, final years under Hobby ownership (1977–1992)
Beginning in 1977, KPRC dropped music and changed to a news/talk station. KPRC showed improvement in the spring 1977 Arbitron ratings from a year ago, this time averaging 17,200 listeners per week and ranking eighth in Houston/Galveston.

In 1979, KPRC hired Anita Martini as sports director. She was reportedly the first woman to become a radio sports director in a major media market.

KPRC's final season broadcasting Houston Astros games was in 1980. The Astros broadcasting rights moved to KENR in 1981.

In 1983, the Hobby family corporation was renamed H&C Communications, and it sold the Houston Post to the Toronto Sun Publishing Corporation. Under "More Information" section: "Following the sale of the Houston Post in 1983, the family reorganized their broadcast holdings as H&C Communications."

After decades of being affiliated with NBC, KPRC changed to the CBS Radio network in February 1988.

Ten years after the last game broadcast on KPRC, the Houston Astros signed a new contract with KPRC in November 1990 following a mutual agreement with previous station KTRH to end their contract one year early.

Further sales, shift to conservative talk (1992–present)

In October 1992, H&C Communications announced the sale of KPRC AM to Sunbelt Broadcasting Company for $3.5 million, with the sale being finalized in February 1993. With that acquisition, former KHOU sports director Dan Patrick became general manager and part-owner of both KPRC and sister station KSEV. He had his own talk show on KPRC until 2000.

KPRC had been declining in the ratings leading up to the purchase by Sunbelt, ranked 16th in the Houston/Galveston market in fall 1992. Following the sale closing, in an effort to make the two stations more competitive against KTRH, Patrick announced changes to the KPRC and KSEV schedules to focus on conservative talk radio effective April 5, 1993. Branded as "Supertalk Radio", both stations would simulcast The Rush Limbaugh Show; KPRC also added commentary segments by Paul Harvey and Jim Hightower and a sports talk show co-hosted by Houston Chronicle columnist Ed Fowler and play-by-play announcer John O'Reilly, Sports Page. 

Then in March 1994, Patrick hired former Houston mayor Kathy Whitmire, a Democrat, to host a nightly show. Patrick commented: "Whitmire will lend some balance. She's a liberal-to-moderate Democrat, and I think to have a female liberal Democrat on the air will be neat." That show would be short lived. In July, Whitmire accepted an offer to become president and CEO of Junior Achievement effective September 6.

Sunbelt, in turn, sold KPRC and KSEV to Clear Channel Communications in 1995 for a combined $26.8 million, ending nearly 70 years of local ownership for KPRC. 

Beginning around December 1998, KPRC hired former Apollo 7 astronaut Walter Cunningham to host a nightly 8 p.m. show, Liftoff to Logic.

On August 29, 2000, Patrick resigned from KPRC after seven years as general manager and talk show host. KPRC subsequently added The Dr. Laura Program.

In March 2001, KPRC re-branded as "Talk Radio 950 KPRC". That month, Chris Baker joined as a new afternoon drive host. In another programming change, Ian Punnett replaced Cunningham as 8 p.m. host around February 2001.

Baker moved to sister station KTRH effective November 15, 2004.

On July 30, 2007, KPRC became the new flagship station for the Walton & Johnson morning show, which moved from Cumulus Media's Houston rock station KIOL. Beginning August 2007, KPRC rebranded as "The 9-5-0 Radio Mojo", with Chris Baker returning to supplement his other show on KTRH and nationally syndicated shows including The Dave Ramsey Show, Mancow, and The Phil Hendrie Show.

On March 17, 2013, KPRC dropped the Radio Mojo brand and became known as "KPRC AM 950, Houston's More Stimulating Talk Radio".

On July 28, 2014, KPRC signed a contract to broadcast University of Houston football and men's basketball. KPRC and the University of Houston renewed their contract in August 2020.

Programming and operations
Most hours begin with national news from Fox News Radio. On weekdays, KPRC broadcasts locally and nationally produced talk shows. KPRC is the originating station for two nationally syndicated shows, Walton & Johnson and The Jesse Kelly Shows National programming on weekdays includes the Glenn Beck Radio Program and Coast to Coast AM. On weekends, KPRC has mostly brokered time programs purchased by local businesses. KPRC also broadcasts local sports, specifically Houston Cougars football and Houston Cougars men's basketball games from the University of Houston.

The station's studios are located near the West Loop Freeway in Uptown Houston.

At night, to protect other stations on 950 AM, it uses a directional antenna. The transmitter site is located off the North Interstate 610 Loop and Liberty Road in the Settegast neighborhood on the northeast side.

References
Works cited
 

Notes

External links

FCC History Cards for KPRC

News and talk radio stations in the United States
Radio stations established in 1925
PRC (AM)
1925 establishments in Texas
IHeartMedia radio stations